Dar Gol is a village in Hormozgan Province, Iran.

Dar Gol may also refer to:
 Dar Gol-e Seyyed Hasan, Kermanshah Province
 Dar Gol-e Teymaz, Kermanshah Province
 Dar Gol, Lorestan

See also
 Dargol